Theodore Clarke (born 29 April 1860, date of death unknown) was a Barbadian cricketer. He played in three first-class matches for the Barbados cricket team from 1883 to 1888.

See also
 List of Barbadian representative cricketers

References

External links
 

1860 births
Year of death missing
Barbadian cricketers
Barbados cricketers
People from Saint Michael, Barbados